Gabriel Katopodis (born 6 March 1967) is an Argentine lawyer and politician, currently serving as the country's Minister of Public Works since 10 December 2019, in the cabinet of President Alberto Fernández. From 2011 to 2019, Katopodis was intendente (mayor) of General San Martín, a partido in the Greater Buenos Aires metropolitan area.

Early life and education
Gabriel Katopodis was born in 1967 in the uptown Buenos Aires neighborhood of Belgrano to a family of Greek background. He studied law at the University of Buenos Aires and became involved in political activism through his work in poor neighbourhoods of the Buenos Aires Province.

He counts with a postgraduate degree on public management from FLACSO and a master's degree on public administration from the University of Buenos Aires School of Economics.

Political career
Katopodis's public service career began in 2003, during the presidency of Néstor Kirchner, when he worked in the Ministry of Social Development. From 2005 to 2008 he was Undersecretary of Operation Co-ordination in the provincial Ministry of Social Development of Buenos Aires Province under Governor Felipe Solá.

In 2007 he ran for the mayoralty of General San Martín, losing in the primaries against incumbent mayor Ricardo Ivoskus.

Intendencia of General San Martín
In 2011, Katopodis ran for the mayoralty of San Martín for a second time, this time against Daniel Ivoskus, the incumbent mayor's son. Katopodis won in an upset victory by just 7 percentage points. He ran under the Frente Social ticket, aligning himself to the ruling Front for Victory.

Katopodis was re-elected for a second term in 2015, this time beating former mayor Ricardo Ivoskus.  Noteworthy achievements of his second term in the mayoralty include the inauguration of a municipality-run safe space for women fleeing gender-based violence in 2018, and the inauguration of the Metrobus North Line on Route 8 in 2019.

In 2019 he ran for a third term, this time on the Frente de Todos ticket, and was elected with 54.85% of the popular vote, becoming the most voted mayor in the history of General San Martín.

Ministry of Public Works
On 6 December 2019, the newly elected president of Argentina, Alberto Fernández, announced the entirety of his incoming cabinet, in which Katopodis was touted to be the new Minister of Public Works. He assumed the position alongside the rest of the cabinet on 10 December 2019. His deputy in the mayoralty, Fernando Moreira, took his position as intendente upon his appointment in the ministry.

In 2020 he denounced that the previous administration had amassed a $ 35,000-million debt on public works, and up to 60% of all ongoing works were completely paralyzed. Katopodis stated that due to the accumulated debt, the ministry's priorities would be federal integration, job creation, and the completion of ongoing works.

Personal life
Katopodis is married to Nancy Cappelloni, a school teacher and politician, with whom he has two children. Since the 1980s the Katopodis household has lived in San Martín, part of the Greater Buenos Aires metropolitan area. He is a supporter of Boca Juniors.

Katopodis observes the Greek Orthodox faith.

References

External links

Official website of the Ministry of Public Works (in Spanish)

1967 births
Living people
Argentine people of Greek descent
20th-century Argentine lawyers
Mayors of General San Martín Partido
Government ministers of Argentina
Lawyers from Buenos Aires
University of Buenos Aires alumni